The state of Victoria, Australia, has a strong sporting culture and includes many popular sports.

The most popular sports played in the state are basketball, Australian rules football, cricket, shooting, soccer, and netball. Horse racing joins that list as the most popular spectator sports.

Team Sports

Australian rules football

In terms of both attendance and media coverage, Australian rules football is the most popular sport in the state.  The participation rate of 4% is the third highest in the country with 223,999 players counted in 2004. Australian rules football  originated in Melbourne in 1858. Ten of the eighteen Australian Football League clubs are based in Victoria, and the Melbourne Cricket Ground (MCG) is held by many to be the spiritual home of the game. Victoria hosted all Australian Football International Cup competitions from 2002 to 2017.

Current Teams
Melbourne Football Club est 1858
Geelong Football Club est 1859
Carlton Football Club est 1864
North Melbourne Football Club est 1869
Essendon Football Club est 1871
St. Kilda Football Club est 1873
Western Bulldogs Football Club est 1877
Richmond Football Club est 1885
Collingwood Football Club est 1892
Hawthorn Football Club est 1902

Basketball
Basketball has the highest participation rate in the state. Melbourne United (previously Melbourne Tigers) and South East Melbourne Phoenix are Melbourne's current teams in the National Basketball League (Australia). United have won the championship 4 times, in 1993, 1997, 2005-2006 and 2007-2008, with the Phoenix, being a new club, having yet to win a title. Both team currently play home games at John Cain Arena in the centre of Melbourne, with SE Phoenix playing several games a year at the State Basketball Centre in the eastern Melbourne suburb of Wantirna South.
Between 2010 and 2013, Basketball in Victoria experienced an increase in participation and at the time had more players in the state than any other sport.

Current Teams
Melbourne United est 1984
South East Melbourne Phoenix est 2018

Cricket

Cricket is also popular in Victoria. The governing body for the sport is Cricket Victoria which administers the 1,182 cricket clubs and 112,000 registered cricketers in Victoria, and 62,774 children involved in school-based competition. The Victorian cricket team is the state team for both men and women and currently competes in the Sheffield Shield, Marsh One-Day Cup and Women's National Cricket League.

Since 2011, the Melbourne Renegades and Melbourne Stars have competed in the Big Bash League, Australia's professional domestic Twenty20 series.

Current Teams
Victorian cricket team est 1851
Melbourne Renegades est 2011
Melbourne Stars est 2011

Soccer

Soccer in Victoria is governed by the Football Victoria. It is particularly popular among migrant communities and has one of the highest sporting participation level in the state (after basketball). Victoria currently features three teams in the National A-League in both the men's and women's competitions.

Current Teams
Melbourne Victory FC est 2004
Melbourne City FC est 2009
Western United FC est 2018

Rugby league

The predominantly Australian rules football-dominated state of Victoria didn't play host to much rugby league football, which was traditionally a New South Wales and Queensland-based game during the 20th century. Some representative games were played in Melbourne to gauge public interest in the sport in the early 1990s and the crowds were encouraging.

When the newly formed National Rugby League re-emerged in 1998, Melbourne Storm was part of the lineup of clubs. They have since become one of the most successful teams in the League and gained a significant following in their home state.

As of 2022, there are 17 amateur clubs based in Melbourne with further clubs in regional areas around the state.

Melbourne hosted several international matches including: Australia vs England during the 2008 Rugby League World Cup and again in the 2010 Four Nations Series, the 2010 ANZAC Test, which attracted a capacity crowd at the newly opened AAMI Park and several games at the 2017 Rugby League World Cup including a quarter final.

Current Teams
Melbourne Storm est 1997

Motorsport

Motor racing has its Australian roots in Melbourne. One of the earlier motor races was held on a horse racing venue in Melbourne, but organised motor racing as we know it today began with the first running of the Australian Grand Prix, held on a rectangular dirt road course on the streets of Phillip Island in 1928. The Grand Prix wandered across the country in subsequent decades but today is held as part of the Formula One World Drivers Championship on the streets of inner Melbourne around Albert Park Lake. A modern Phillip Island Grand Prix Circuit hosts the Australian motorcycle Grand Prix. The state has more motor racing circuits than any other as well as providing the home base for more than half of the teams contesting the premier domestic motor racing series, V8 Supercar. Even New South Wales' signature motor race, the Bathurst 1000, has its roots in Victoria, having been first held as a 500-mile race at Phillip Island.

Netball

Netball is recognised as the largest female participation sport in Australia. In Victoria there are in excess of 105,000 registered participants, which does not include the tens of thousands of school children that participate in school netball programs annually.

Approximately 240 associations/groups affiliate with Netball Victoria on an annual basis. Affiliation provides access to netball events, programs and services as well as a pathway to State, National and International representation. Associations are geographically grouped into one of the 20 Regions, and then Regions are grouped into one of six Zones. 96% of the Netball Victoria membership is female. 55% of the membership resides in regional Victoria with the remaining 45% in the metropolitan suburbs in and around Melbourne. 62% of the Netball Victoria membership is aged seventeen (17) and under, with the majority of the remaining participants aged between eighteen and fifty. Victoria has two teams in the national Super Netball competition, the Melbourne Vixens and Collingwood Magpies.

Current Teams
Melbourne Vixens est 2007
Collingwood Magpies est 2016

Rugby union

According to the Australian Bureau of Statistics  (2007), Victoria has very low rugby participation (less than 1%), dominated by amateur competition run by the Victorian Rugby Union, and participation in many private schools. However, international rugby matches attract large attendances, (e.g.  2003 Rugby World Cup, and  sevens at the 2006 Commonwealth Games).

The Melbourne Rebels represent Victoria in the professional Super Rugby competition. Their formation was long-awaited in the state, the Victorian Rugby Union having bid twice previously for a licence, the first time in 1995, losing to the ACT Brumbies, and the second time in 2005, losing to the Western Force. Their bid for the 15th licence was successful in 2010.

Current Teams
Melbourne Rebels est 2010

Open Water Swimming

Open water swimming is a popular sport throughout Victoria. There is an ever-growing number of races right around Port Phillip Bay, Western Port Bay and Victoria's Ocean Coast. There are even a small number of races held in Rivers and Lakes.

The open water swim season in Victoria runs from early December to Mid-March of the following year. Several swims occur on Australia Day which also marks the "middle" of the season. It attracts up to 4000 participants each year.

Some other well known swims include;
Melbourne Swim Classic - Held on the first Saturday of March - St Kilda
Swim for Your Life - Brighton
Point Leo Swim Classic
Portsea Swim Classic
Mount Martha Australia Day Swim
Big Bay Swim - Port Melbourne to Williamstown
Bloody Big Swim - Frankston to Mornington
Pier to Perignon - Sorrento to Portsea

The standard distance of the majority of the swims on the open water swim calendar is between 1 km and 2 km with the most common distance used being 1.2 km. Other swims however, cover much longer distances, including the Bloody Big Swim which covers 11.2 km.

Many famous swimmers are known to have participated in these swims including Olympic Gold medalists Kieren Perkins and Michael Klim. It is also a popular hobby of many other famous people including many AFL footballers, Australian cricketers including Simon O'Donnell and politicians including former Premiers of Victoria Steve Bracks and Ted Baillieu.

Special events 

Annually, Melbourne hosts the Australian Open tennis tournament, one of the four Grand Slam tournaments; the famous Melbourne Cup horse race; the 'Boxing Day' cricket test match held each year from 26–30 December at the Melbourne Cricket Ground; and the Australian Masters golf tournament. The Wallabies, Australia's national rugby union team, usually also play at least one Test annually in Melbourne.

Rivalling the Open early in the year, the Formula One World Drivers' Championship visits the Albert Park street circuit to contest the Australian Grand Prix (which was originally hosted by Adelaide, South Australia). Also Phillip Island hosts the Australian motorcycle Grand Prix for MotoGP bikes as well as a round of the World Superbike Championship, and Stawell is the home of Australia's most prestigious foot race, the Stawell Gift.

The MCG was the site of the first ever cricket test match between Australia and England in 1877, and has been the main stadium for the 1956 Summer Olympics and 2006 Commonwealth Games.

As well as Olympic and Commonwealth Games, Melbourne has hosted numerous sporting events which rotate host cities. Melbourne co-hosted the 2003 Rugby World Cup, including many pool matches as well as a quarter final – all of which were played at the Telstra Dome; hosted the 1975, 1979, 2003, 2007, 2009, 2011 and 2015 events of the basketball FIBA Oceania Championship; hosted the 2002 World Masters Games; the first city outside the United States to host the World Police and Fire Games in 1995, and the Presidents Cup golf tournament in 1999; and was the first city in the Southern Hemisphere to host the World Cup Polo Championship in 2001.  The city has hosted FIFA World Cup qualifiers in both 1997 2001 and 2009

The state will host the 2026 Commonwealth Games, regionally across Victoria and Melbourne.

Major Sports Venues

Melbourne

Outside Melbourne

Current professional bodies in national competitions

Melbourne

Outside Melbourne

See also
 Australian rules football in Victoria
 Rugby league in Victoria

References